The Airman Battle Uniform (ABU) is a U.S. camouflage combat uniform formerly worn by members of the United States Air Force, United States Space Force, and some civilian employees of the U.S. Department of the Air Force until April 2021. It replaced the Battle Dress Uniform and Desert Camouflage Uniform on 1 November 2011 after a four-year phase-in period.

On 14 May 2018, The U.S. Air Force announced that all airmen will transition from the Airman Battle Uniform to the OCP Uniform. All airmen have been permitted to wear the OCP Uniform since 1 October 2018, and the wear out date for the ABU was 1 April 2021. The ABU is currently worn by the Civil Air Patrol.

History

2000s

2003–2006: Prototypes and testing

The first prototype of the ABU was unveiled in the summer of 2003. The early uniform prototypes consisted of trousers, an embroidered undershirt, and a blouse. The prototype camouflage pattern was a blue/gray, tigerstripe pattern, based upon the tigerstripe uniforms worn by airmen during the Vietnam War.

After months of wear testing, Air Force officials revised the color scheme and camouflage pattern due to feedback received from airmen. The new semi-pixelated tiger-stripe pattern would trade its dominant blue overtones for a more subdued palette, similar to the Universal Camouflage Pattern, but with some added slate blue tones. The uniform maintains a similar cut to the previous Battle Dress Uniform, rather than the contemporary Army Combat Uniform. The fabric was made in 50-50 nylon and cotton in order to reduce the need for summer/winter-type uniforms.

2007: ABU Roll-out
On 2 October 2007, the Air Force began issuing the ABU to enlisted trainees in Basic Military Training at Lackland Air Force Base, was issued to the Class of 2012 at the United States Air Force Academy on 26 June 2008, and was made available for all airmen. Since 2008, it has been issued to airmen deploying to locations in the CENTCOM area of responsibility.

2009: Airman Battle Shirt introduced
Starting in 2009, airmen who were in ground combat roles, such as Security Forces, were issued the new Airman Battle Shirt (ABS). The ABS was based on the Army Combat Shirt (ACS). Like the ACS, the ABS is a stand-alone shirt designed specifically for use with Improved Outer Tactical Vest armor in warm and hot weather. It is intended to greatly increase user comfort through the use of lightweight, moisture-wicking, and breathable fabrics. The ABS features the same tiger stripe pattern on the sleeves.

2010s
In 2010, the Operation Enduring Freedom Pattern Army Combat Uniform was authorized to replace the Airman Battle Uniform for airmen in the War in Afghanistan.

In June 2011, The Air Force Times released the announcement of a summer weight ABU to be available in 2012. The Improved Airman Battle Uniform will be made of a 50–50 nylon-cotton blend and was composed of the same material used by the Army for the ACU. Just like the ABU, the IABU is machine washable and also wrinkle resistant. Chief of Staff of the Air Force Gen. Norton A. Schwartz gave approval of the IABU coat and pants which will be available to trainees at Basic Military Training first.

The ABU was fully phased in on 1 October 2011, completely replacing the BDU and DCU though most airmen had been wearing the ABU for several years by that point.

2016: Civil Air Patrol adopts the ABU

The Air Force's civilian auxiliary, Civil Air Patrol, wear-tested the ABU in late 2015, and in May 2016, the national commander of the Civil Air Patrol issued a memorandum allowing the wear of the ABU effective 15 June 2016. However, the uniform is worn with dark blue background and light silver lettering name and branch tapes and black boots in order to distinguish CAP personnel.

2018: Switch to Operational Camouflage Pattern
All airmen have been authorized to wear the Operational Camouflage Pattern instead of ABUs since 1 October 2018. Recruits in basic training and cadets in Air Force Reserve Officer Training Corps, and Officer Training School started being issued OCPs on 1 October 2019. The Airman Battle Uniform was no longer authorized to wear after 1 April 2021.

2020s

2022: Use by Ukraine
A limited number of Ukrainian Armed Forces personnel have been photographed wearing the ABU during the 2022 Russian invasion of Ukraine.

Features and attributes

The Airman Battle Uniform is similar to the Universal Camouflage Pattern (UCP) in color, with the inclusion of slate blue, but is otherwise nearly identical to the BDU cut.  The ABU is to be worn with sage green combat boots. The ABU does have essential NIR (near-infra red) qualities, and the sleeves are authorized to be rolled up.

Overview of the Airman Battle Uniform is as follows:
 Headwear
 Patrol cap.
 Boonie cover is available for the ABU for use in deployed locations.
 Organizational ballcaps are authorized for RED HORSE and Combat Arms Training and Maintenance personnel.
 Berets are authorized for Special Warfare, Security Forces, and Combat Aviation Advisers.
 Sage-green or black watch cap for cold climate environments with outerwear.
 Sand T-shirt
 Blouse
 All insignia, including occupational badges (aeronautical wings, occupational badges, etc.), are embroidered in midnight-blue thread with urban-gray background with the exception of rank insignia for 2nd Lieutenant and Major, which incorporate brown thread.
 Name and service tapes are embroidered in midnight-blue thread on ABU patterned background tapes.
 Chaplain, aeronautical, space, cyber, missile, occupational badges, duty shields, commander's badge, and weapons school patches are authorized.
 Outerwear such as APECS parka and sage green fleece are authorized for the ABU
 Sand rigger's belt
 Trousers
 Sage green combat boots
 DLA green socks.

Backpacks and other accessories must be sage, black, or ABU pattern.

Users

 : Worn by Dominican Air Force.
 : Worn by Egyptian Air Force and Egyptian Air Defense Forces
 : 
: Former standard camouflage uniform of US Airmen from 2007 to 2021. It is still authorized for wear by members of the Civil Air Patrol, the official civilian auxiliary of the U.S. Air Force, as of 2021.
: Worn from 2019 to 2021.

See also

Current U.S. uniforms
 Army Combat Uniform
 Marine Corps Combat Utility Uniform
 Navy Working Uniform
 Operational Dress Uniform (U.S. Coast Guard)

Former U.S. uniforms
 Battle Dress Uniform
 Desert Battle Dress Uniform
 Desert Night Camouflage

Notes

References

External links

 History of U.S. Air Force Uniform Project – Tiger Stripe Products

United States Air Force uniforms
United States military uniforms
Camouflage patterns
Air force uniforms
Military camouflage
Military equipment introduced in the 2000s